Cardinia Reservoir is an Australian man-made water supply saddle dam reservoir. The  water store is located in Emerald–Clematis–Dewhurst in south-eastern suburbs of Melbourne, Victoria. Construction started in May 1970 and was completed in 1973 at a cost of more than 11.4 million. The dam that creates the impoundment is called the Cardinia Dam.

History
As Melbourne's water supplies struggled through the 1960s the need for additional water storage became evident. Cardinia Creek ran from the Dandenong Ranges to Western Port, passing through some small but well-defined hills south of the outer suburb of Emerald. This site was chosen as being suitable for a new reservoir. In 1966, plans for the construction of the Cardinia and Thomson reservoirs were accepted by the Government of Victoria. Construction of the Tarago Reservoir commenced in 1966 and was completed in 1969. This water storage was built by the State Rivers and Water Supply Commission of Victoria (SR&WSC) to improve the capacity of the water supply system to meet the ever increasing demand for water in the district. By 1967, Melbourne struggled through a severe drought and water restrictions were imposed in the summer of 1967–68. As a result, plans for construction of Cardinia and Thomson reservoirs were advanced.

With the construction of one large rolled earthfill and rockfill embankment to serve as the Cardinia Dam wall, and some other saddle dams in nearby hills, the large water storage facility of the Cardinia Reservoir was created. The dam was built by Fluor Construction, and engineered by Snowy Mountains Engineering Corporation, under contract to the Melbourne Metropolitan Board of Works (MMBW). At 100% capacity the dam wall was designed to hold back  of water. The ungated uncontrolled spillway is capable of discharging .

Construction of the dam was completed in 1973, following which it took another four years to fill, including substantial water transfers from Silvan Reservoir. As part of the Victorian Government's policy that fluoride should be added to all public water supplies, construction began on local fluoridation plants. In 1981, following continued demand for potable water on the Mornington Peninsula finally exceeded the district's ability to meet its own water supply needs. Despite upgrading of existing facilities, water from the MMBW reservoir at Cardinia was first used to supplement local water supplies. Export of "Australia Pure", a bottled water from Cardinia Reservoir, commenced in 1993 to several European countries and the United States.

The surrounds of the reservoir were allocated $1 million for landscaping work to create a recreational area including picnic areas, playgrounds, carparks and walking tracks.

Operations
Cardinia receives water via a pipeline from Silvan Reservoir. A  hydroelectric power station at the outlet of the pipeline generates electricity as water is transferred to Cardinia. Water from Cardinia supplies Melbourne's southern and south-eastern suburbs, and the Mornington Peninsula.

The Cardinia Reservoir is managed by Melbourne Water.

Gallery

See also

Cardinia Dam Power Station

References

External links

Cardinia Reservoir Park, Parks Victoria
Cardinia Reservoir and Catchment, Cardinia Reservoir Park – Information Kit, March 2003, Parks Victoria

Reservoirs in Victoria (Australia)
Melbourne Water catchment
Rivers of Greater Melbourne (region)
Embankment dams
Hydroelectric power stations in Australia
1973 establishments in Australia
Shire of Cardinia